Derbyshki is a residential area in the city of Kazan, the capital of the Republic of Tatarstan, Russia.
Until November 1998 it was two rural localities (Bolshiye Derbyshki and Malyie Derbyshki), which were merged into Kazan in November 1998 along with a number of other rural localities of Vysokogorsky District.

History

The origin of the name is unknown but it is perhaps that it might be from a man named Dervish.  There was an Astrakhan khan of the Kazan Khanate called Darwish Ghali II from 1554 to 1556. In the 16th century Near rivers the Kazanka River and the Kinderka River settled village Derbyshkino. In 1567, there were three peasant households: Derbyshki Small, Derbyshki Large and third — empty. Derbyshki Small Derbyshki located on Archa Darugha, where the Noksa River empties into the Kazanka River. Derbyshki Large located at near the Kazanka and Kinderka rivers. On the territory of the empty farm appeared the current settlement Derbyshki. In 1650 its population was 41 people.

With the advent of the railway "Derbyshki" was built. In 1932 it was decided to build a railway car factory, but due to the political situation on 8 February 1940 it was decided to construct the Kazan Optical and Mechanical Plant (KOMZ). During the Second World War residents of besieged Leningrad were evacuated to Derbyshki. Many of them stayed after the war. One of the largest opto-electronic instrument research and production facilities was established in Derbyshki - NPO "State Institute of Applied Optics, founded in 1966 on as a branch of the S.I.Vavilov State Optical Institute.

Economy
In the settlement there are:
3 industrial enterprises
2 companies regard
8 schools
13 kindergartens
3 health institution 
4 sports facilities, including the "Raketa" stadium
there’s also the Lake Komsomolskoye, ski jumping hill, and piste are in wood

Gallery

References

External links
Website of Derbyshki 
History of Derbyshki 

Kazan